Star FK Radium is an American instrumental rock trio formed in June 2008. The band, which consists of Bill Martien (guitar), Alissa Taylor (violin) and Matt Clarke (drums), plays a form of chamber rock and post rock which it calls "musicbox". The trio is currently reported to be working on its second full length release.

Discography
Blue Siberia (Independent release, 2010)
Solitude Rotation (Independent release, 2012)

References

External links 
 Official Website

American instrumental musical groups
Musical groups from Washington, D.C.